Cherlagudam (from cherla, lake and gudam, hamlet) is a village in Medak district, Telangana state, India.

References

Villages in Medak district